The Capa Bridge is a historic bridge in rural Jones County, South Dakota. Its main span is a Pratt through truss  in length, which has been riveted rather than pinned together. The bridge also has five smaller approach spans on the west and two on the east, made of wooden stringers. The bridge piers are either concrete or wood pile, and the outermost abutments are wood pile. The bridge was apparently built in 1919 by a county crew, and is one of only two pre-1920 bridges in the state to use a riveted Pratt truss.

The bridge was listed on the National Register of Historic Places in 1993.

See also
National Register of Historic Places listings in Jones County, South Dakota
List of bridges on the National Register of Historic Places in South Dakota

References

Road bridges on the National Register of Historic Places in South Dakota
Bridges completed in 1919
Buildings and structures in Jones County, South Dakota
National Register of Historic Places in Jones County, South Dakota
Pratt truss bridges in the United States
1919 establishments in South Dakota